The Qishan River or Nanzixian River is a tributary of the Gaoping River in Taiwan. It flows through Chiayi County, Kaohsiung City, and Pingtung County for 117 km.

Bridges
 Jiaxian Bridge

See also
List of rivers in Taiwan

References

Rivers of Taiwan
Landforms of Kaohsiung
Landforms of Pingtung County